Dudh Sagar Water Falls railway station (Station code: DWF) is a small railway station in South Goa district, Goa. It serves the Dudhsagar Falls. The station consists of a single platform. The platform is not well sheltered. It lacks many facilities, including water and sanitation. This station is one of three in the Braganza Ghats.

Nearest railway stations

References

Hubli railway division
Railway stations in South Goa district